Doddaalahalli Kempegowda Suresh  a.k.a. D. K. Suresh is an Indian member of Parliament of the 17th Lok Sabha of India. He represents the Bangalore Rural constituency of Karnataka and is a member of the Indian National Congress political party.

Early life and education
D. K. Suresh was born in Doddaalahalli, Ramanagara in the state of Karnataka, as the son of Kempegowda and Gowramma. He is the younger brother of D. K. Shivakumar, another noted Congress leader and the minister for water resources in the second H. D. Kumaraswamy ministry. Suresh has received education till higher secondary. By profession, Suresh is a farmer and a businessperson.

Political career
D. K. Suresh is a three time MP. He was elected into 15th Lok Sabha in by-election on 21 May 2013 after sitting MP (then) H. D. Kumaraswamy’s resignation .

Posts held

See also

15th Lok Sabha
Politics of India
Parliament of India
Government of India
Indian National Congress
Bangalore Rural Lok Sabha constituency

References

India MPs 2009–2014
1966 births
Indian National Congress politicians from Karnataka
Lok Sabha members from Karnataka
Politicians from Bangalore
People from Bangalore Rural district
Living people
India MPs 2014–2019
India MPs 2019–present